Broker is a 2022 South Korean drama film written and directed by Japanese filmmaker Hirokazu Kore-eda, and starring Song Kang-ho, Gang Dong-won, Bae Doona, Lee Ji-eun, and Lee Joo-young. The film revolves around characters associated with baby boxes, which allow infants to be dropped off anonymously to be cared for by others. The film was selected to compete for the Palme d'Or at the 2022 Cannes Film Festival, where it was screened on 26 May and won Ecumenical Jury Award and the Best Actor Award for Song Kang-ho. It was released on June 8, 2022, in theaters in South Korea.

Synopsis
Ha Sang-hyeon is the owner of a hand laundry and volunteers at the nearby church, where his friend Dong-soo works. The two run an illegal business together: Sang-hyeon occasionally steals babies from the church's baby box with Dong-soo, who deletes the church's surveillance footage that shows a baby was left there. They sell the babies on the adoption black market. But when a young mother So-young comes back after having abandoned her baby, she discovers them and decides to go with them on a road trip to interview the baby's potential parents. Meanwhile, two detectives, Soo-jin and Lee, are on their trail.

Cast
 Song Kang-ho as Ha Sang-hyeon, the owner of a hand laundry who takes babies from a baby box at a nearby church and sells them with the help of his partner Dong-soo.
 Gang Dong-won as Dong-soo, Sang-hyeon's right-hand man who works part-time at the church and covers for Sang-hyeon.
 Bae Doona as Soo-jin, a police detective who is investigating the two men's illegal business.
 Lee Ji-eun as Moon So-young, a mother who decides to leave her baby at the baby box.
 Lee Joo-young as Detective Lee, Soo-jin's colleague who also participates in the investigation.
 Park Ji-yong as Woo-sung, So-young's baby
 Im Seung-soo as Hae-jin, a child in the same nursery as Dong-soo who joins the brokers' journey.
 Kang Gil-woo as Mr. Lim, a trader who illegally trafficks children.

Special appearances
 Lee Moo-saeng as Seon-ho
 Ryu Kyung-soo as Shin Tae-ho
 Song Sae-byeok as a kindergarten director.
 Kim Seon-young as the wife of the kindergarten director
 Lee Dong-hwi as Song
 Kim Sae-byuk as Song's wife
 Park Hae-joon as Yoon
 Baek Hyun-jin as Detective Choi
 Kim Ye-eun as Im's wife

Production

Development
The idea for Broker was initially conceived by Kore-eda while researching the Japanese adoption system for his 2013 film Like Father, Like Son, discovering in the process its similarities with the South Korean adoption system. He learned about Japan's only baby box, a place where people can anonymously leave children, and the criticism surrounding the system in Japan. It can be found all around the world, including South Korea, where it is much more popular in comparison with Japan. After Kore-eda discussed with Song, Bae, Gang making a film together, he decided to combine the two ideas. Kore-eda had previously become acquainted with Song and Gang at various film festivals, while he met Bae on the set of his 2009 film, Air Doll. Kore-eda has described Broker as being a companion piece to his 2018 film Shoplifters, with the two films sharing a thematic interest in social outcasts who come together to form unconventional families.

The film was announced on August 26, 2020, with Song, Bae, and Gang set to star, under the working title reported to be Baby, Box, Broker or simply Broker. Kore-eda originally used Baby, Box, Broker as the goal of the story was to connect the three elements. However, as he was writing the script he settled on Broker because he "realized that [the film] had this structure where it's the detective's side, Soo-jin's side, that ultimately wants the baby to be sold the most. The 'broker' in the film changes as the story unfolds. And I thought by focusing on the word Broker, the title would become very simple and strong. I really liked this structure where the person wanting to sell the baby inverts as the storytelling progresses."

Writing
After meeting with the three South Korean actors, Kore-eda started working on the script. Kore-eda said the first image that came to his mind was "of Song Kang-ho, wearing a bride's outfit and holding a baby, smiling at the baby and then selling the baby." After the casting of actress Lee Ji-eun, who is also a renowned singer in South Korea, Kore-eda chose to add a scene where Lee sings a lullaby. Even though he had written an initial draft, Kore-eda struggled with the ending of Broker and he ended up rewriting it many times during the shooting with the help of Song.

Casting
Kore-eda said Song was the South Korean actor he wanted to collaborate with the most and the first person who came to his mind for the role of Sang-hyeon. Gang and Bae came to the director's attention after he saw their performances in Secret Reunion and Air Doll respectively, with the latter being directed by Kore-eda himself. In February 2021, Lee Ji-eun was announced to have joined the cast. Kore-eda chose to cast Lee after having seen numerous Korean dramas while in quarantine, including the 2018 television series My Mister starring Lee, where her performance impressed him. Lee said she accepted because she was looking forward to playing a mother when Kore-eda offered her the role. While preparing for the role, she researched how society views single mothers and the hardships they go through. In March 2021, it was reported that Lee Joo-young had joined the cast. She was picked by Kore-eda after he saw her performance in Itaewon Class and A Quiet Dream.

Filming
Principal photography took place from April 14 to June 22, 2021. The director of photography is Hong Kyung-pyo. Notable filming locations include Pohang, Uljin and Samcheok.

Music

The score was written by South Korean composer Jung Jae-il. It was digitally released on June 15, 2022.

Songs not featured on the official soundtrack:

 "Tes Bro! (테스형!)" by Na Huna
 "Yeosu Night Sea (여수 밤바다)" by Busker Busker
 "Jin Jin Ja Ra (진진자라)" by Tae Jin-ah
 "The One I Remember (그때 그 사람)" by Shim Soo-bong
 "Wise Up" by Aimee Mann
 "Schlafe, mein Prinzchen, schlaf ein" by Lee Ji-eun

Release

In May 2022, prior to the film's Cannes premiere, Neon acquired the US distribution rights. Picturehouse Entertainment acquired the UK and Ireland distribution rights. The film's rights were also pre-sold to Metropolitan Filmexport (France), Gaga Corporation (Japan), Koch Films (Germany and Italy), Triart Film (Scandinavia), September Films (Benelux), Edko Film (Hong Kong and Macao) and Madman Entertainment (Australia and New Zealand). According to CJ E&M, the film has been sold to 171 countries ahead of its premiere in competition at 75th Cannes Film Festival. The number of countries then rose to 188.

Broker was released in Hong Kong and Singapore on June 23 and in Japan on June 24. It was selected as the closing film of the 69th Sydney Film Festival and was screened on June 19. The Canadian premiere was held at the 2022 Toronto International Film Festival in September. It was released in the United States on December 26, 2022. It also was released in France in the same month.

Reception

Box office
Broker was released on June 8, 2022, on 1,594 screens. It opened with 146,221 admissions and topped the South Korean box office. The film crossed 1 million cumulative admissions in 11 days of release, by recording 1,040,709 cumulative viewers. It became the first film directed by Kore-eda to surpass 1 million admissions in South Korea.

, it is at 11th place among all the Korean films released in the year 2022 with gross of US$9,672,172 and 1,260,740 admissions. Its largest international market is Japan, with gross of US$4,470,263.

Critical response
Broker was screened at the Lumière Theater, the main theater of the Cannes International Film Festival, on May 26, 2022. After the film finished, there was a standing ovation from the audience for 12 minutes. The site's critics consensus reads: "Broker skirts the edges of sentimentality, but is consistently grounded by Kore-eda Hirokazu's warm, tenderly melancholic approach." Metacritic assigned the film a weighted average score of 76 out of 100, based on 20 critics, indicating "generally favorable reviews".

Ella Kemp of IndieWire graded the film as A- and wrote, "The execution of this premise is, somehow, miraculous in its sensitivity, asking questions about issues of ethics, of choice, of money, and murder, and family, and how to find love in all this sorry mess."

Writing for The Hollywood Reporter, David Rooney praised the actors' performances and Kore-eda's direction, saying, "much of this might have been formulaic in less artful hands, but Kore-eda has an unfaltering lightness of touch, a way of injecting emotional veracity and spontaneity into every moment."

Nicholas Barber of BBC rated the film with five stars out of five and called it, "One of the year's most delightful films."

Tim Robey of Telegraph.co.uk rated the film with two stars out of five and stated, "Anaemic and maudlin by turns, this may be the Cannes competition's biggest disappointment."

Accolades
Broker was selected to compete for Palme d'Or and won the Ecumenical Jury Award at the 2022 Cannes Film Festival. Song Kang-ho became the first South Korean actor to win Best Actor in the Cannes Film Festival history. The film was selected in CineMasters competition section at Munich Film Festival, where it won the Best International Film award.

Notes

References

External links
 
 
 
 

2022 films
2022 drama films
2020s Korean-language films
South Korean drama films
Films about babies
Films about adoption
Films directed by Hirokazu Kore-eda
Films set in Busan
Films set in Incheon
Films set in North Gyeongsang Province
Films set in Seoul
Films shot in South Korea
Films with screenplays by Hirokazu Kore-eda
CJ Entertainment films